Nigerian one thousand-naira note ( ₦ 1000 or NGN 1000) is a denomination of the Nigerian currency. The one thousand-naira note was introduced in October 2005.

On 12 October 2005, Olusegun Obasanjo launched the ₦ 1000 note.

References 

Currencies of Nigeria
Currencies introduced in 2005
Economy of Nigeria